Keith Philip Dutch (born 21 March 1973) is a former English cricketer who played eight seasons at Middlesex County Cricket Club and four at Somerset.  He was primarily a one-day cricketer, appearing in over twice as many List A cricket matches as first-class cricket.  He played as an all-rounder, but never reached his potential; during his time at Middlesex he made irregular appearances, and did not claim his first five-wicket haul in a match until his final year at the county in 2000.  His move to Somerset brought him some rewards: a more regular place in the team, and his maiden (and only) century.  His first-class opportunities became increasingly limited, and at the end of 2005, after not appearing all season, he turned down a contract extension and ended his professional cricket career.

References

1973 births
English cricketers
Marylebone Cricket Club cricketers
Middlesex cricketers
Somerset cricketers
Living people
People from Harrow, London